RTP Açores is a Portuguese free-to-air regional television channel owned and operated by state-owned public broadcaster Rádio e Televisão de Portugal (RTP) in the Autonomous Region of the Azores. It began broadcasting on 10 August 1975 from its studios in Ponta Delgada.

History

Buildup

In 1975, during the transformative phase of Portugal's transition from Estado Novo regime to Third Portuguese Republic, Ramalho Eanes, then president of the administrative council at RTP solicited a dossier already published by João Paz on the future of regional broadcasting, then referred to as RTP-Açores. After studying the process, its implications and conditions, Ramalho Eanes informed António Borges Coutinho that this project would be implemented swiftly.

Along with Sousa Gomes and Sidónio Paes, the administrative council saw the public station in the Azores: "...as to contribute to the eradication of illiteracy...an instrument for education and culture...an instrument to promote cultural democracy...a vehicle that contributed to a better knowledge for all citizens...a means to appeal to unity and social responsibility for all...and a contribution that [served] positive collaboration in the transition and institutionalization of democracy".

Instability at the national/regional levels and the move towards more autonomy and independence meant that RTP's motives were met with anxiety and distrust, the national broadcaster at that time being a tool of the Armed Forces Movement (MFA). In the streets of Ponta Delgada, for example, local cultural brigades were already trying to mould values and guide the transformation towards democracy.

Following the Carnation Revolution, the move towards a decentralized constitution, with an autonomous status for regional authorities, the island of São Miguel in the archipelago of the Azores, was chosen for the broadcasting centre. Local news and entertainment was broadcast from its first studios in a building in the outskirts of the urban area of Ponta Delgada, in the locality of Sao Gonçalo.

First broadcast
Following some adaptations of the spaces, the first broadcast was aired on 10 August 1975, and lasted six hours. The first broadcast began at 3:30 in the afternoon, with a speech by President of the Board of Governors, General Altino Pinto de Magalhães, and lasted until 9:30, at the end of a newscast. This first transmission was marked by several gaffes, firstly by General Pinto (who was thrust into the position of regional leader only months earlier), then in the transmission of the programming, that included General à Força. After this film, Telejournal published local/regional and national news (already two days late) before a caption appearing to round out the emission, stating "Silence...we are going to laugh". At the conclusion of this first emission, a technical flaw did not permit the playing of the national anthem, resulting in one viewer calling in to berate the studio, stating "...this here is still Portugal".Correio (2005), p.11-12

One of the programs shown on launch day, the Polish series Chłopi (The Peasants), caused controversy among the viewing audience, ostensibly due to the behavior portrayed. The channel employed a staff of about 20 people, and broadcast Tuesdays to Sundays from 19:00 to 22:00, with the employees taking a day off on Monday.

During these early broadcasts, the regional operator produced three hours of daily broadcasts per day for two months. In the successive years, the Azoreans began to trust the local broadcasters, with improvements made to the functioning of the service, including the operation of the Estação Terrena de Satélites da Marconi, which allowed signals from the continent to reach the Azores directly (rather than time-delay broadcasts). But, coverage was not even, as many of the islands were not covered, and many of the programming was stilled delivered from the continent and the content was censored, due to concerns for "public morality".

Modernization
Even so, television in the Azores was seen a "mirror" on Azorean culture, and a "window" on the other islands of the archipelago. This changed during the administration of Lopes Araújo; in July 1984, after completing a course in Law on the continent, he returned to the Azores, and at the age of 26, assumed an approach to revitalize regional programming and promote RTP Açores internationally. He contracted new professionals (such as producer José Medieros), produced programming directed towards the Azorean population and links to the diaspora in the United States. This included transmitting direct from Ponta Delgada, via satellite, the festivals of Senhor Santo Cristo dos Milagres in 1985, as well as broadcasting the news from the Azores to services in North America, Canada and Bermuda, starting in 1987.

The signal's reached increased to cover the islands of Flores and Corvo in 1988.

Programming during this period began to diversify and became more polished, with a concentration on information programming (Jornal de sábado, Notícias, Sumário), entertainment (with talk shows like Aqui Açores and Gente Nossa) and the beginning of the production of fiction programming. Until this time, production of fictional storytelling was not full-developed; Lopes de Araújo considered this "the noble stage of production", due to the demands on people, technical requirements and financial means, in addition to a level of experience and maturity necessary to realize large productions. To this, on July 1986, the Regional Centre of the Azores produced Xailes Negros (a mini-series) which attempted break the mould and provide dynamic fiction and storey-telling, from scratch, while other productions have moved to adapt pre-existing public literature and works by celebrated Azorean authors.

The channel launched nationwide on cable and satellite providers on 7 May 2015 on MEO, NOS and Vodafone, and on the remaining providers the following day during the Feast of the Lord Holy Christ of the Miracles. The plans stated that RTP Açores was going to launch on these providers until August 2015.

Programs

Arts and culture
 Arte & Emoção
 Ler +, Ler Melhor
 Ler Açores
 Ler Mais - Açores

Children
 A Família Addams (United States) Bombeiro Sam (United Kingdom) Brinca Comigo
 Conta com os Desportos (United States) Espaço Infantil
 Eu e os meus Monstros (Australia / United Kingdom) 
 Gombby (United States) Lulu Cambalhota (France) Nutris
 O Comboio dos Dinossauros (United States / Canada) O Meu Amigo Gigante (France) Ooglies (United Kingdom) Pororo, O Pequeno Pinguim (South Korea) Zorori, O Fantástico (Japan)''

Entertainment
 Açores Hoje
 Planeta Música

Magazine
 A Hora de Baco
 A Voz do Cidadão
 Açores Vip
 Biosfera
 Consigo
 Endereço Desconhecido II
 Gostos e Sabores
 Iniciativa
 Janela Indiscreta com Mário Augusto
 Magazine Canadá Contacto
 Magazine EUA Contacto - Califórnia
 Magazine EUA Contacto - N. Inglaterra
 Magazine EUA Contacto - N. Jersey
 Magazine Europa Contacto
 Nós
 República do Saber
 Salvador
 Viajar é Preciso

Music
 Palcos
 Poplusa
 Top +

News and affairs
 Consulta Externa
 Especial Informação (Açores)
 Jornal da Tarde Açores
 Noticias do Atlântico
 O Tempo
 Parlamento
 RTP3 simulcast
 Telejornal Açores

Religious
 70x7
 Caminhos

Sport
 2.ª Volta
 Alta Pressão
 Lançamento
 Teledesporto

Talk-shows
 Atlântida (Açores)
 Atlântida (Madeira)
 Bairro Alto
 Portugal Aqui Tão Perto

Other
 Saber de Nós
 Sabores das Ilhas
 Um Natal Distante
 Videograma

References 
Notes

Sources

External links 
 RTP/RDP Açores - Official website
 RTP Açores Live Stream on RTP Play

Mass media in the Azores
Publicly funded broadcasters
Mass media in Portugal
Television channels and stations established in 1975
Television stations in Portugal
Portuguese-language television stations
1975 establishments in Portugal
Rádio e Televisão de Portugal
Mass media in Ponta Delgada